Anticypella is a genus of moths in the family Geometridae.

Species
 Anticypella diffusaria (leech, 1897)

References
 Anticypella at Markku Savela's Lepidoptera and Some Other Life Forms

Ennominae
Geometridae genera